Operation Iron Hammer may refer to:

 Operation Eisenhammer (Iron Hammer), a planned military operation in World War II
 Operation Iron Hammer (Iraq 2003), a military operation of the multinational force during the Iraq War 
 Operation Iron Hammer (Iraq 2005), a joint U.S.–Iraqi military operation during the subsequent insurgency

See also
 Operation Hammer (disambiguation)